Governor Bell may refer to:

Charles H. Bell (politician) (1823–1893), 38th Governor of New Hampshire
Charles J. Bell (politician) (1845–1909), 50th Governor of Vermont
Frank Bell (governor) (1840–1927), 6th Governor of Nevada
Gawain Westray Bell (1909–1995), Governor of Northern Nigeria from 1957 to 1962
Henry Hesketh Bell (1864–1952), Governor of the Uganda Protectorate from 1905 to 1909, Governor of the Leeward Islands from 1912 to 1916, and 21st Governor of Mauritius from 1916 to 1924
John Bell (New Hampshire politician) (1765–1836), 12th Governor of New Hampshire
John C. Bell Jr. (1892–1974), 33rd Governor of Pennsylvania
John R. Bell (military officer) (fl. 1820s), Interim Governor of East Florida in 1821
Peter Hansborough Bell (1810–1898), 3rd Governor of Texas
Philip Bell (governor) (1590–1678), Governor of Bermuda from 1626 to 1629, Governor of Providence Island colony from 1629 to 1636, and Governor of Barbados from 1640 to 1650
Robert Duncan Bell (1878–1953), Acting Governor of Bombay in 1937
Samuel Bell (1770–1850), 8th Governor of New Hampshire